Evi Sachenbacher-Stehle (born 27 November 1980) is a retired German cross-country skier and biathlete from Reit im Winkl who has competed since 1998. She was born in Traunstein, West Germany. Competing in three Winter Olympics, she won five medals with two golds (Team sprint: 2010, 4 × 5 km relay: 2002) and three silvers (Individual sprint: 2002, 4 × 5 km relay: 2006, 2010).

Sachenbacher-Stehle has also won six medals at the FIS Nordic World Ski Championships with a gold (4 × 5 km relay: 2003) and four silvers (5 km + 5 km double pursuit: 2003, team sprint: 2007 with Claudia Künzel-Nystad, 4 × 5 km relay: 2009) and a bronze. She also has fourteen individual victories at various levels in distances up to 5 km in her career from 1998 to 2006.

She received a five-day suspension at the beginning of the 2006 Winter Olympics due to a high hemoglobin level. She was one of twelve athletes given five-day suspensions for health reasonsthe International Ski Federation decided they could not safely compete due to an abnormally high red blood cell counts.

From the 2012/2013 season, she switched to biathlon, citing motivational problems, and was given a slot in the German B-team. Members of the B-team are eligible to compete in IBU Cup races. Her results in the IBU-Cup made her eligible to compete in the Biathlon World Cup. In her first World Cup race, on 14 December 2012 in Pokljuka, Sachenbacher-Stehle finished 59th. On 6 January 2013 she achieved the first IBU Cup podium, finishing second in the 7.5 km sprint in Otepää. As of January 2014, her best individual performance in a World Cup race remains sixth place in 7.5 km sprint in Sochi on 10 March 2013. She finished fourth in the 12.5 kilometre mass start biathlon competition of the Sochi 2014 Olympic Games on 17 February 2014.

On 21 February 2014, it was confirmed that Sachenbacher-Stehle had tested positive for methylhexanamine during the Sochi Olympic Games. She was stripped of her Olympic accreditation, and her results were annulled. In July 2014, she was banned for two years for doping. In November 2014 it was announced that the Court of Arbitration for Sport had ruled that her ban should be cut to six months after she appealed, on the grounds that her failed test was due to contamination of food supplements. However shortly afterwards she announced her retirement from the sport in an interview on the television programme Sportschau.

She married German alpine skier Johannes Stehle in July 2005.

Cross-country skiing results
All results are sourced from the International Ski Federation (FIS).

Olympic Games
 5 medals – (2 gold, 3 silver)

World Championships
 6 medals – (1 gold, 4 silver, 1 bronze)

a.  Cancelled due to extremely cold weather.

World Cup

Season standings

Individual podiums
 3 victories – (3 )
 12 podiums – (12 )

Team podiums
 7 victories – (4 , 3 )
 25 podiums – (19 , 6 ) 

Note:   Until the 1999 World Championships, World Championship races were included in the World Cup scoring system.

Overall record

a.  Classification is made according to FIS classification.
b.  Includes individual and mass start races.
c.  Includes pursuit and double pursuit races.

Note: Until 1999 World Championships, World Championship races are part of the World Cup. Hence results from the 1999 World Championships are included in the World Cup overall record.

Biathlon results

Olympic Games

References

 
 McCauley, Janie. "2002 champ loses appeal of high hemoglobin suspension", Ski Racing, 11 February 2006.

External links

 
 
 
 
 
 
  

1980 births
Living people
People from Traunstein
Sportspeople from Upper Bavaria
Cross-country skiers at the 2002 Winter Olympics
Cross-country skiers at the 2006 Winter Olympics
Cross-country skiers at the 2010 Winter Olympics
Biathletes at the 2014 Winter Olympics
German female cross-country skiers
German female biathletes
Olympic cross-country skiers of Germany
Olympic biathletes of Germany
Olympic gold medalists for Germany
Olympic silver medalists for Germany
Olympic medalists in cross-country skiing
FIS Nordic World Ski Championships medalists in cross-country skiing
Medalists at the 2010 Winter Olympics
Medalists at the 2006 Winter Olympics
Medalists at the 2002 Winter Olympics
Doping cases in biathlon
German sportspeople in doping cases